Mohammed Ghermati (born 23 January 1897, date of death unknown) was a French long-distance runner. He competed in the marathon at the 1924 Summer Olympics.

References

External links
 

1897 births
Year of death missing
Athletes (track and field) at the 1924 Summer Olympics
French male long-distance runners
French male marathon runners
Olympic athletes of France
Sportspeople from Oran